Wuhan University (WHU) is a public research university in Wuhan, Hubei. The university is affiliated with and sponsored by the Ministry of Education of China.

Wuhan University is a member of the Double First Class University Plan, Project 211, and Project 985. The university is known for research in fields such as the social sciences, remote sensing, survey engineering, and hydraulic engineering.

History

The predecessor of the university dates back to the Ziqiang Institute, which was founded in 1893 by Zhang Zhidong, governor of Hubei and Hunan provinces in the late Qing Dynasty.

It changed its name several times before it was named National Wuhan University in July 1928 and was among the first group of national universities in modern China. (There is a dispute on the establishment of Wuhan University: Some believe that its history should date back to 1913, when the National Wuchang Higher Normal College was founded.)

In the early time of its establishment, Ziqiang Institute provided four courses: Chinese, Mathematics, Nature, and Business. After combining the Institute of Minerals and the Institute of Chemical, courses provided were enlarged, with Nature Science and Engineering added. Chinese was extended to English, French, German, Russian, and Japanese.

In October 1902, Ziqiang Institute moved to Dongchang kou, Wuchang, and changed its name to Foreign Languages Institute, teaching Geography, History, Mathematics, Law, and Communication.

With the approaching Xinhai Revolution of 1911, the Foreign Languages Institute was forced to pause due to lack of funding. In October, the Wuchang Uprising and the end of the Qing dynasty made it impossible for the school to go back to normal. The Foreign Languages Institute stopped running.

In 1913, the Ministry of Education of Beiyang Government decided to found six higher normal colleges in China. Based on the original location, book resource, and faculties of Foreign Language Institute, the Wuchang State Superior Normal Institute was founded.

In 1922, faculties were extended to Education Philosophy, Chinese, English, Mathematics, Physics and Chemical, History and Sociology, Biology, and Geography.

In August 1923, the school changed its name to the National Wuchang Normal University. In 1924, it changed its name to National Wuchang University.

In 1926, National Wuchang University merged with the National Wuchang Business University, Hubei University of Medicine, Hubei University of Law, Hubei Arts and Humanity University, Wuchang Private Chinese University to form National Wuchang Sun Yat-Sen University, alias National No. 2 Sun Yat-Sen University, with Department of University, and subjects of Arts, Science, Law, Business, Medicine and Yu, 17 faculties, 2 departments.

In 1928, the National Government in Nanjing formed National Wuhan University on the basis of the original National Wuchang Sun Yat-Sen University, consisting of four colleges: Arts, Law, Science, and Engineering.

In February 1929, the jurist Wang Shijie became the first president of Wuhan University. During the War of Resistance Against Japan, Wuhan University moved to Leshan, Sichuan Province and returned to Luojia Hill after the war.

By the end of 1946, the university had six faculties: liberal arts, law, sciences, engineering, agriculture and medicine. Wuhan University enjoyed a very high academic status, with Wang Shijie, Wang Xinggong, and Zhou Gengsheng as its successive presidents.

Scholars such as Gu Hongming, Zhu Kezhen, Wu Baoliang, Zha Qian, Gui Zhiting, Ye Yage, Li Siguang, Wen Yiduo, Huang Kan, Yu Dafu, Shen Congwen, Zhu Guangqian, Liu Ze, Liu Yongji, Ye Shengtao, Yang Duanliu, and Li Jiannong taught here successively. According to the university, in 1948, the University of Oxford wrote an official letter to the Ministry of Education of the Chinese National Government, stating that Bachelors of liberal arts and sciences that graduated from Wuhan University with average grades above 80 could enjoy "the senior status of Oxford".

In 1952, after a general reshuffle of the colleges and departments of the higher education institutions throughout the country, Wuhan University became a university of liberal arts and sciences directly under the administration of the Ministry of Higher Education. Professor Li Da, delegate to the First Congress of the Chinese Communist Party and a celebrated philosopher, economist and academician of the Chinese Academy of Sciences, held the post of president of the university for 14 years. The Wuhan University School of Medicine and Tongji University Medical School jointly formed Central-south Tongji Medical College (later Wuhan Medical College), then Tongji Medical University.

Merger
On August 2, 2000, with the approval of the State Council of the People's Republic of China, the new Wuhan University was established as a combination of four major universities close together: the former Wuhan University, the former Wuhan University of Hydraulic and Electrical Engineering (WUHEE), the former Wuhan Technical University of Surveying and Mapping (WTUSM), and the former Hubei Medical University (HBMU).

Note:
Wuhan University of Hydraulic and Electrical Engineering (WUHEE) (colloquially ).
Wuhan Technical University of Surveying and Mapping (WTUSM) (colloquially ).
Hubei Medical University (HBMU) (colloquially ).

Historical names

Academics
In 2018, Wuhan University's student body consisted of 29,405 full-time undergraduates and 19,699 full-time master's degree candidates, 7,163 Ph.D candidates and 2,453 international students.

Rankings and Reputation

China
Wuhan University is ranked among the top 10 universities in China.

In 2016, CUAA ranked it the 4th.

In 2015, CUAA ranked it the 4th and Wu Shulian ranked it the 7th.

In 2014, CUAA ranked it the 5th and Wu Shulian ranked it the 7th.

World
In 2022, QS World University Rankings ranked it 194th in the world and 8th in China.

In 2022, U.S. News & World Report ranked it 150th in the world, 24th in Asia and 11th in China.

In 2022, Academic Ranking of World Universities ranked it between # 101-150 in the world and 15th in Asia. In 2020, it ranked 23rd in Greater China (including Mainland China, Hong Kong, Macau and Taiwan).

It came 157th in the 2022 Times Higher Education World University Rankings where it ranked 25th in Asia and 8th in China. Internationally, Wuhan University is regarded as one of the most reputable Chinese universities by the Times Higher Education World Reputation Rankings where it ranked 151st globally.

In Q4 2020, it was ranked 1st among Eastern Asian universities by the amount of venture capital funding raised by unicorn startups founded by its alumni.

Schools and colleges

School of Philosophy
School of Chinese Classics
College of Chinese Language and Literature
School of Foreign Languages and Literature
School of Journalism and Communication
School of Art
School of History
School of Economics and Management
School of Law
School of Marxism
Department of Sociology
School of Political Science and Public Management
College of Education
School of Information Management
School of International Education
School of Mathematics and Statistics
School of Physics and Technology
College of Chemistry and Molecular Sciences
College of Life Science]
School of Resource and Environmental Sciences
Institute for Advanced Studies (IAS)
School of Power and Mechanical Engineering
School of Electrical Engineering and Automation
School of Urban Design
School of Civil Engineering
School of Water Resources and Hydropower Engineering
Electronic Information School
School of Computer Science
School of Cyber Science and Engineering
School of Geodesy and Geomatics
School of Remote Sensing and Information Engineering
School of Printing and Packaging
School of Medicine
Medical Research Institute
School of Basic Medicine Sciences
School of Health Sciences
Renmin Hospital of Wuhan University, Hubei General Hospital
Zhongnan Hospital
School of Stomatology
School of Pharmaceutical Sciences
Medicine Vocational and Technical School

Campus

The university has rolling physical features with the scenic Luojia Hill and the beautiful East Lake. Its campus is heavily wooded and green, with fragrant flowers everywhere year-round. Wuhan University is widely known as one of the most beautiful universities in China, especially for its cherry blossom garden. A cherry blossom festival is held every spring.

Most stylish old buildings were designed by F. H. Kales (1899–1979). Educated in MIT, Kales was a pioneer to blend western architectural styles with traditional Chinese elements, which is most evident from his roof designs.

Wuhan University boasts a campus covering an area of 5508 mu and has a floor area of 2.42 square kilometres. The university's libraries have a collection of approximately 5.4 million volumes and subscriptions to more than 10,000 Chinese and foreign periodicals.

Cooperation
Wuhan University has established cooperative relationship with more than 300 universities and research institutes in over 40 countries and regions.

School of Information Management at Wuhan University signed a cooperation agreement with Royal School of Library and Information Science in Denmark in 2009.
Wuhan University has collaborated with Duke University and the city of Kunshan to establish Duke Kunshan University.

Art and culture
Luojia Golden Fall Art Festival
Luojia Golden Fall International Cultural Festival
Students' Associations Cultural Festival
Campus Supermarket of Cultural Activities

Notable alumni

Guo Moruo, Chinese author, poet, historian, archaeologist, and government official from Sichuan, China
Chen Tanqiu, Chinese revolutionary, founding member of the Chinese Communist Party
Shen Congwen, Chinese writer
Wen Yiduo, Chinese poet and scholar
Li Long Lam, Hong Kong Archaeologist
Li Siguang, the founder of China's geomechanics
Ling Shuhua, Chinese modernist writer whose short stories became popular during the 1920s and 30s
Wan Exiang, professor of international law at Wuhan University, vice president of the Supreme People's Court of China, and vice president of the Revolutionary Committee of the Kuomintang
Wang Yanyi, Chinese immunologist and current Director General of the Wuhan Institute of Virology
Su Xuelin, Chinese author and scholar
Xiaokai Yang, Chinese-Australian economist.
Wang Tieya, an eminent Chinese jurist and former judge of the International Criminal Tribunal for the Former Yugoslavia
Li Haopei, Chinese jurist, diplomat and academic
Chao Yao-dong, Taiwanese politician, economist and former Minister of Economic Affairs (1981–84)
Wu Mi, one of the founders of Chinese comparative literature
Chi Li, contemporary Chinese writer
Zheng Lihui, a Chinese gymnast, was part of the Chinese team that won the gold medal in the team event at the 2000 Summer Olympics in Sydney
Xiao Hailiang, a Chinese diver who became an Olympic champion in the 3m Springboard Synchronized event at the 2000 Summer Olympics
Li Da, Chinese Marxist philosopher
Karim Massimov, Prime Minister of Kazakhstan (2007–2012)
Lei Jun, founder of Xiaomi Tech, one of China's largest technology companies
Liu Jingnan, GPS engineer, member of Chinese Academy of Engineering, former president of Wuhan University
Xiaolin Wu, computer engineer, invented programming line algorithm, co-developed neural network facial recognition system (with Xi Zhang), twice featured in MIT's "Technology Review", member of Institute of Electrical and Electronics Engineers
Yi Zhongtian, writer, historian and professor at Xiamen University

Bin Jiang, Professor, in GIS at Högskolan i Gävle (HIG)
Tiare Aguilera Hey, Rapa Nui politician

Incidents
In 2009, the university had been cited as part of a scandal involving corruption by its administrators.

References

External links

Official website 
Official website 
Official BBS 

 
Major National Historical and Cultural Sites in Hubei
Project 211
Project 985
Universities and colleges in Wuhan
Universities in China with English-medium medical schools
Vice-ministerial universities in China
1893 establishments in China
Educational institutions established in 1893
Universities and colleges formed by merger in China